Mouad Ouites is an Algerian karateka. He represented Algeria at the 2019 African Games and he won one of the bronze medals in the men's team kata event.

In 2018, he competed in the men's individual kata event at the World Karate Championships held in Madrid, Spain.

In 2019, he also competed at the African Beach Games held in Sal, Cape Verde where he won the silver medal in the men's individual kata event. He also won the gold medal in the men's team kata event.

At the 2019 African Karate Championships, he won one of the bronze medals in the men's individual kata event. In 2021, he won the silver medal in the men's team kata event at the African Karate Championships held in Cairo, Egypt.

References 

Living people
Year of birth missing (living people)
Place of birth missing (living people)
Algerian male karateka
African Games medalists in karate
African Games bronze medalists for Algeria
Competitors at the 2019 African Games
21st-century Algerian people